The light heavyweight competition at the 2015 AIBA World Boxing Championships was held from 7–15 October 2015. This was a qualifying tournament for the 2016 Summer Olympics.

Medalists

Seeds

  Adilbek Niyazymbetov (quarterfinals)
  Julio César la Cruz 
  Teymur Mammadov (round of 16)
  Joe Ward

Draw

Finals

Section 1

Section 2

Results

Ranking

References

External links
Draw Sheet
Official Website of 2015 AIBA Boxing Championship

2015 AIBA World Boxing Championships